Yechezkel Hakohen Rabinowicz (also spelled Rabinowitz, Rabinowich, Rabinovitch) (1862 – 22 November 1910) was the third rebbe of the Radomsk Hasidic dynasty. He was the grandson of the founder of the dynasty, Shlomo Rabinowicz, and the second son of the second Radomsker rebbe, Avraham Yissachar Dov Rabinowicz. He is known as the Kenesses Yechezkel after the title of a work he wrote.

Biography
Rabinowicz initially was rabbi of Novipola, and became the third Radomsker rebbe after his father's death in 1892.

Death and legacy
Rabinowicz, who suffered from diabetes like his father, also died at the age of 48, on 22 November 1910. An estimated 25,000 people attended his funeral from all over Poland and Galicia, and special trains brought mourners from Łódź, Bendzin and Czestochowa. His Torah teachings were compiled under the title Kenesses Yechezkel, published in 1913.

He had two sons, Elimelech Aryeh, the Rav of Siedliszcze, and Shlomo Chanoch, who succeeded him as Radomsker Rebbe. Both sons were murdered in the Holocaust.

Rebbes of Radomsk
Shlomo Hakohen Rabinowicz, the Tiferes Shlomo (1801–1866)
 Avraham Yissachar Dov Hakohen Rabinowicz, the Chesed LeAvraham (1843–1892)
 Yechezkel Hakohen Rabinowicz, the Kenesses Yechezkel (1862–1910)
 Shlomo Chanoch Hakohen Rabinowicz, the Shivchei Kohen (1882–1942)
  Menachem Shlomo Bornsztain, Sochatchover-Radomsker Rebbe (1934–1969)

References

Rebbes of Radomsk
Polish Haredi rabbis
19th-century Polish rabbis
20th-century Polish rabbis
People from Radomsko
1864 births
1910 deaths